The Zimbabwe women's under-19 cricket team represents Zimbabwe in international under-19 women's cricket. The team is administrated by Zimbabwe Cricket (ZC).

The team played their first official matches at the 2023 ICC Under-19 Women's T20 World Cup, the first ever international women's under-19 cricket competition. The side finished bottom of their group at the inaugural tournament.

History
The inaugural Women's Under-19 World Cup was scheduled to take place in January 2021, but was postponed multiple times due to the COVID-19 pandemic. The tournament was eventually scheduled to take place in 2023, in South Africa. As a Full Member of the ICC, Zimbabwe qualified automatically for the tournament.

Zimbabwe announced their 15-player squad for the tournament on 7 December 2022. Trevor Phiri was announced as Head Coach of the side. The side finished bottom of the initial group stage at the tournament, and lost a subsequent play-off against Indonesia.

Recent call-ups
The table below lists all the players who have been selected in recent squads for Zimbabwe under-19s. Currently, this only includes the squad for the 2023 ICC Under-19 Women's T20 World Cup.

Playing record

International match summary

Women's under-19 Twenty20 record against other nations

References

Women's Under-19 cricket teams
C
Zimbabwe in international cricket